Kazmashevo (Qaźmaş) is a rural locality (a village) in Amangildinsky Selsoviet, Abzelilovsky District, Bashkortostan, Russia. The population was 538 as of 2010. There are 8 streets.

Geography 
Kazmashevo is located 22 km west of Askarovo (the district's administrative centre) by road. Ryskuzhino is the nearest rural locality.

References 

Rural localities in Abzelilovsky District